The 1991 Pearl Assurance British Open was a professional ranking snooker tournament, that was held from February to March 1991 at the Assembly Rooms in Derby, England.
 
Stephen Hendry won the tournament by defeating Gary Wilkinson 10–9 in the final. The defending champion Bob Chaperon was defeated in the last 64 by Franky Chan.

The qualifiers would mark the end of the playing career of veteran commentator Clive Everton.


Main draw

Final

References

British Open (snooker)
1991 in snooker
1991 in British sport